The military history of the United Kingdom covers the period from the creation of the united Kingdom of Great Britain, with the political union of England and Scotland in 1707, to the present day.

From the 18th century onwards, with the expansion of the British Empire and the country's industrial strength, the British military became one of the most powerful and technologically advanced militaries in Europe and the world. Its navy in particular, with major bases in four Imperial fortresses and coaling stations surrounding the globe, was without a doubt the world's greatest naval force from the 18th to the mid-20th century. British military declined in the mid-20th century as did those of the traditional European continental powers following the two world wars, decolonisation, and the rise of the United States and the Soviet Union as the new superpowers. However, Britain remains a major military power with frequent military interventions around the world since the end of the Cold War in 1991. The present-day British Armed Forces encompass the Royal Navy, the British Army, and the Royal Air Force.

Britain has been involved in a great many armed conflicts since the union in 1707, on all continents except for Antarctica.

18th century
 War of the Spanish Succession (1702–13) - England and Scotland, later Great Britain, Holy Roman Empire, Portugal and the Dutch Republic, were allied against France and Spain.
 Queen Anne's War (1702–13)
Jacobite Rebellions (1715–16; 1719; 1745–46) - Civil War
 Clifton Moor Skirmish, near Penrith (1745) - last land battle in England
 Battle of Culloden (1746) - last land battle in Britain.
 War of the Quadruple Alliance (1718–20) - Great Britain, France, Austria and the Dutch Republic v. Italy and Spain
 Anglo-Spanish War (1727–1729)
 War of Jenkins' Ear (1739–42) - Great Britain v. Spain.
 War of the Austrian Succession (1742–48) - Great Britain, Austria and the Dutch Republic v. France and Germany
 Seven Years' War (1756–63) - the first "world war"
 French and Indian War & Seven Years' War is the same War (1754–63) - Great Britain, Hanover, Portugal, and Prussia
 Anglo-Cherokee War (1759–63) - Britain v. Cherokee nation
 Pontiac's Rebellion (1763–66) - Britain v. American Indian coalition
 First Anglo-Mysore War (1766–69) - Britain v. Kingdom of Mysore
 American Revolutionary War (1775–83) - Britain v. United States, France, Netherlands & Spain
 First Anglo-Maratha War (1775–82) - Britain v. Maratha Empire
 Fourth Anglo-Dutch War (1780–84) - Britain v. the Dutch Republic
 Second Anglo-Mysore War (1780–84) - India
 Third Anglo-Mysore War (1789–92) - India
 Australian frontier wars (1788–1930s) - Britain v. Australian Aborigines
 French Revolutionary Wars (1793–1802) - Great Britain, Austria, Spain, Russia and Germany v. France
 War of the First Coalition (1793–97)
 War of the Second Coalition (1798–1801)
 Fourth Anglo-Mysore War (1798–99) - India
 Irish Rebellion (1798) - Britain v. United Irishmen and France.

19th century
 Australian frontier wars (1788–1930s)
 French Revolutionary Wars (1793–1802) - Great Britain, Austria, Spain, Russia, Prussia, French Royalists v. French Revolutionaries
 War of the First Coalition (1793–97)
 War of the Second Coalition (1798–1801)
 Napoleonic Wars (1803–15) - United Kingdom, Prussia, Austria, Sweden, Spain, Portugal and Russia v. France
 South American War (1806–07)
 Anglo-Turkish War (1807–09)
 Anglo-Russian War (1807–12)
 Gunboat War (1807–14)
 Peninsular War (1808–14)
 Hundred Days (1815)
 First Kandyan War (1803–04) - Sri Lanka
 Second Anglo-Maratha War (1803–05) - India
 Vellore Mutiny (1806) - India
 War of 1812 (1812–15) - Britain v. United States.
 Anglo-Nepalese War (1814–16)
 Second Kandyan War (1815) - Sri Lanka
 Third Anglo-Maratha War (1817–18) - India
 Anglo-Ashanti wars (1823–1900) - Ghana
 First Anglo-Burmese War (1824–26)
 Upper Canada Rebellion (1837)
 Lower Canada Rebellion (1837)
 Syrian War (1839–40)
 First Anglo-Afghan War (1839–42)
Battle of Ghazni
 First Opium War (1839–42) - United Kingdom v. China
 Gwalior campaign (1843)
 First Anglo-Sikh War (1845–46) - India
 New Zealand Wars (1843–1872)
 Second Anglo-Sikh War (1848–49) - India
 Second Anglo-Burmese War (1852–53)
 Crimean War (1854–56) - United Kingdom, France, Ottoman Empire, and Piedmont-Sardinia v. Russia
 Second Opium War (1856–60) - United Kingdom and France v. China
 Anglo-Persian War (1856–57) - United Kingdom and Persia
 Indian Rebellion (1857)
 Pig War (1859) - United Kingdom v. USA
 Anglo-Bhutanese War (1865)
 Expedition to Abyssinia (1868)
 Second Anglo-Afghan War (1878–80)
 Anglo-Zulu War (1879)
 First Boer War (1880–81)
 Gun War (1880–81)
 Mahdist War (1881–99)
 Third Anglo-Burmese War (1885)
 Sikkim Expedition (1888)
 Anglo-Zanzibar War (1896)
 Tirah Campaign (1897–98)
 Second Boer War (1899–1902)
 Boxer Rebellion (1900) - United Kingdom, Austria-Hungary, France, Germany, Italy, Japan, Russia, USA, and China

20th century
 Anglo-Aro war (1901–02) - Nigeria.
 British expedition to Tibet (1903–04)
 World War I (1914–18) - Britain, France, Belgium, Serbia, Italy, Russia, United States vs Germany, Austria-Hungary, Bulgaria and Ottoman Empire.
 Aviation in World War I
 Easter Rising (1916) - Ireland
 Allied intervention in the Russian Civil War (1918–22)
 Third Anglo-Afghan War (1919)
 Anglo-Irish War (1919–21)
 World War II (1939–45) see Military history of the United Kingdom during World War II
 Air warfare of World War II
 Pacific War (1937–45)
 Anglo-Iraqi War (1941)
 British–Zionist conflict of Palestine (1945–48)
 Greek Civil War (1946–47)
 Cold War (1946–90)
 Malayan Emergency (1948–60)
 Korean War (1950–53)
 Mau Mau Uprising (1952–60)
 Cyprus Emergency (1955–59)
 Suez Crisis (1956)
 Brunei Revolt (1962)
 Dhofar Rebellion (1962–75)
 Indonesia-Malaysia confrontation (1963–66)
 Aden Emergency (1963–67)
 Northern Ireland Troubles (1969–mid-1990s)
 Cod War Confrontation (1975–76)
 Iranian Embassy Siege (1980)
 Falklands War (1982)
 Gulf War (1990–91)
 Bosnian War (1992–96)
 Operation Desert Fox (1998)
 Kosovo War (1999)

21st century
 Sierra Leone Civil War (2000)
 War on Terror
 War in Afghanistan (2001–2021)
 Iraq War (2003–11)
 Somali Civil War (2009–present)
 Boko Haram insurgency (2012–Ongoing)
 Northern Mali conflict (2013–Ongoing)
 Military intervention against ISIS (2014–Ongoing) 
 Libyan Civil War (2011) 
 Syrian Civil War (2018)

List of civil wars
 Jacobite Rebellions (1715–16; 1719; 1745–46) - the last civil war in Great Britain
 Clifton Moor Skirmish, near Penrith (1745) - the last land battle on English soil
 Battle of Culloden (1746) - the last land battle in Great Britain

See also
 List of all military equipment current and former of the United Kingdom
Declaration of war by the United Kingdom
 History of the British Army
 History of the Royal Navy
 History of the Royal Marines
 History of the Royal Air Force
 History of the foreign relations of the United Kingdom
 List of wars involving Great Britain
 List of wars in Great Britain
 Military history of England
 Military history of Scotland
 Military history of Ireland
Military history of the United Kingdom during World War II
 Timeline of British diplomatic history

References

Further reading
 Black, Jeremy. Britain as a military power, 1688-1815 (Routledge, 2002).
 Black, Jeremy. A military history of Britain: from 1775 to the present (2008)
 Chandler, David, and Ian Beckett, eds. The Oxford Illustrated History of the British Army (1994)
 Colley, Thomas. Always at War: British Public Narratives of War (U of Michigan Press, 2019) online review
 Fortescue, J. W. A history of the British army (19v 1899–1930) online
 Higham, John, ed. A Guide to the Sources of British Military History  (2015) 654 pages excerpt
 Holmes, Richard. Redcoat: the British soldier in the age of horse and musket (WW Norton & Company, 2002).
 Usher, George. Dictionary of British military history (A&C Black, 2009).

 
History
Military